The following is a list of military officers who have led divisions of a civil service.

Canada

Department of National Defence
 Brigadier-General (Ret) Gordon O'Connor, Minister of National Defence, 2006–August 2007

Canada Revenue Agency
Brigadier-General (Ret) Gordon O'Connor, Minister of National Revenue 2007-

United States
A serving military officer, without special authorization, cannot be Secretary of State or Defense. Special circumstances existed for George Marshall, as a five-star General of the Army (GOA). Five-star ranks, which have not been used since shortly after World War II, technically never retire.
The National Security Act of 1947 allows either the Director or Vice Director of Central Intelligence to be a serving officer, but not both.

Central Intelligence Agency
 RADM Sidney Souers, Director of Central Intelligence, 1946
 LTG Hoyt S. Vandenberg, US Army, Director of Central Intelligence, 1946–1947
 RADM Roscoe H. Hillenkoetter, Director of Central Intelligence, 1947–1950
 GEN Walter Bedell Smith, US Army, Director of Central Intelligence, 1950–1953
 VADM William Raborn, Director of Central Intelligence, 1965–1966
 ADM Stansfield Turner, Director of Central Intelligence, 1977–1981
 GEN Michael Hayden, US Air Force, Director of the Central Intelligence Agency, 2006–2009

Department of State
 GOA George Marshall, Secretary of State, 1947–1949
 GEN Colin Powell, US Army (Ret) Secretary of State, 2001–2005

Department of Defense
 GOA George Marshall, Secretary of Defense, 1950–1951

See also
 Civil service
 List of political leaders who held active military ranks in office
 Military officer

Civil services
Lists of military personnel
Military personnel